Arie Schans (born December 12, 1952) is a Dutch football manager. He initially started as a trainer within the Netherlands before he took over as Bhutan's coach and would star within the documentary film The Other Final about the two of the lowest ranked teams in the FIFA World Rankings having to face each other. After beating the opposition Montserrat from the documentary (4–0), he spent some time attempting to improve Bhutanese football quality before returning to assistant coaching and having spells at Oita Trinita and Namibia, the latter of whom he guided to the 2008 African Cup of Nations.

Career
He initially started out as a trainer in 1971, and from 1977 to 1985 he was associated with lower league Dutch side FC Wageningen. In 2001, he was the trainer for Dutch amateur football club GVVV where he became the first trainer within Dutch amateur football to be appointed as full-time.

Schans would take the Bhutan national football team job in 2002 and would star within the documentary film The Other Final, about the two lowest ranked teams in the FIFA World Rankings playing a game. After beating the opposition Montserrat from the documentary, Arie spent several months attempting to improve football standards in Bhutan before deciding to move to Japan and join top tier Japanese side Oita Trinita as an assistant. In 2005, he was brought in as a caretaker manager after Hwangbo Kwan left the club, however Péricles Chamusca soon stepped in on a permanent basis and Arie would soon return to the Netherlands.

After spending several seasons teaching coaches in Australia, Bulgaria, Mozambique and South Africa, Arie returned to football as trainer for top tier Chinese side Changchun Yatai F.C. and aided the young manager Gao Hongbo to win the Championship. The following year Arie took the Namibia national football team job after the sudden death of their previous manager Ben Bamfuchile. Arie was quickly asked to send a squad to the 2008 African Cup of Nations, however within the tournament Namibia were quickly knocked-out of the competition after suffering two defeats and a draw, which soon saw Arie leave the team. This time Arie would move back to China where he was brought in by Nanchang Hengyuan and Beijing Baxy F.C. as a Technical Director before he moved back into management with second tier Chinese club Guizhou Zhicheng on May 28, 2013.

Managerial statistics

References

External links
Profile at Arie Schans.com

1952 births
Living people
Dutch football managers
Dutch expatriate football managers
People from Veenendaal
Expatriate football managers in China
Expatriate football managers in Bhutan
Bhutan national football team managers
J1 League managers
Oita Trinita managers
Expatriate football managers in Namibia
Expatriate football managers in Japan
Namibia national football team managers
Changchun Yatai F.C. managers
2008 Africa Cup of Nations managers
Dutch expatriate sportspeople in China
Dutch expatriate sportspeople in Namibia
Dutch expatriate sportspeople in Japan
Sportspeople from Utrecht (province)